Francisco Urroz may refer to:
 Francisco Urroz (footballer)
 Francisco Urroz (rugby union)